Warrick Palmateer (born 1969) is an Australian studio potter and art teacher. He is most well known for his collaboration with ceramic artist Pippin Drysdale since 1992. Palmateer is the creator of the vessels — both open and closed forms — that Drysdale uses as canvasses. Palmateer also specializes in creating large wheel thrown and coiled vessels.  He is widely regarded by his peers as the finest thrower of porcelain in Australia.

Biography
Palmateer was born in Melbourne in 1969. He graduated with an Advanced Diploma in Studio Ceramics from Perth's North Metropolitan TAFE and gained a Bachelor of Fine Arts in 1999 and a Diploma of Education in 2003 from Curtin University. He works as an art teacher at Prendiville Catholic College in Ocean Reef, Western Australia. His wife is Pauline, a fashion designer. Their daughter is professional surfer Felicity Palmateer.

Career
Collaborating with famous ceramic artist Pippin Drysdale, Palmateer creates porcelain forms that have helped to make Drysdale Australia's highest earning ceramicist. Drysdale credits him with being a key element in her success: 

Apart from his collaborative work with Drysdale, Palmateer also creates monumental forms on a theme of sea, rock and sand. Palmateer, an avid surfer, is inspired by the sea and rock forms found on Western Australia's coast in the littoral zone – where land meets ocean, particularly the bleached limestone at Yanchep Beach. Palmateer uses mouldings and casting of textures from rocks, fossils and shells and uses them on the surface of the brick clay vessels.

References

External links
 Pippin Drysdale and Warrick Palmateer together at the John Curtin Gallery
  
 Palmateer works on Confluence exhibition at Brikmakers factory
 Palmateer works on Curtin University exhibition at Brikmakers factory

1969 births
Australian potters
Living people
Australian ceramicists
Curtin University alumni